Woody Island is an island in south-eastern Australia.  It is part of the Sloping Island Group, lying close to the south-eastern coast of Tasmania around the Tasman and Forestier Peninsulas.

One of the 105 islands of the Recherche Archipelago, it was named by French explorer Bruni d’Entrecasteaux in 1792.

See also

List of islands of Tasmania

References

Sloping Island Group